Sarıgül is a Turkish surname. Notable people with the surname include:

 Mustafa Sarıgül (born 1956), Turkish writer, entrepreneur, and politician
 Yağmur Sarıgül (born 1979), Turkish songwriter and guitarist

See also
 Sarıgül, Elâzığ

Turkish-language surnames